Thiago Neves Fragoso (born 1 November 1981) is a Brazilian actor and singer.

Career
Held along with Mateus Solano the first gay kiss in a novel Rede Globo, in Amor à Vida (2013).

Filmography

Television

Film

Stage

Discography

References

External links

Thiago Fragoso on Instagram

1981 births
Living people
Male actors from Rio de Janeiro (city)
Brazilian male telenovela actors
Brazilian male voice actors
Brazilian male stage actors
21st-century Brazilian male singers
21st-century Brazilian singers
Brazilian male television actors